Kuosmanen is a Finnish surname. Notable people with the surname include:

 Mirjami Kuosmanen (1915 – 1963), Finnish actress
 Antti Kuosmanen (born 1950), Finland's ambassador to the People's Republic of China
 Sakari Kuosmanen (born 1956), Finnish singer and actor
 Juho Kuosmanen (born 1979), Finnish film director and screenwriter 

Finnish-language surnames